The laryngeal inlet (laryngeal aditus, laryngeal aperture) is the opening that connects the pharynx and the larynx.

Borders
Its borders are formed by:
 the free curved edge of the epiglottis, anteriorly
 the arytenoid cartilages, the corniculate cartilages, and the interarytenoid fold, posteriorly
 the aryepiglottic fold, laterally

Additional Images

See also
 aditus

References

External links
  - (listed as 'Inlet of the larynx')

Human head and neck